Alice Wairimu Nderitu is the United Nations Special Adviser on the Prevention of Genocide to United Nations Secretary General António Guterres.

Early life and education
Nderitu holds a master's degree in armed conflict and peace studies (2013) and a Bachelor of Arts, Literature and Philosophy (1990) from the University of Nairobi.

Career
Nderitu has served as a member of the African Union's Network of African Women in Conflict Prevention and Mediation (Fem-Wise), the Women Waging Peace Network, founder of the Community Voices for Peace and Pluralism https://peaceandpluralism.org/ and as a columnist with the East African Newspaper https://www.theeastafrican.co.ke.

Nderitu also served as a Commissioner of the National Cohesion and Integration Commission in Kenya and was one of the founders and first co-chair of Uwiano Platform for Peace, a conflict prevention agency that uses mobile technology to encourage citizens to report indicators of violence, linking early warning to early response.

Nderitu was one of three mediators (the other two were male) of a peace agreement signed by 10 ethnic communities in Nakuru, Kenya. For 16 months, she was the only woman in a peace process of 100 elders and 3 mediators. She was the chief lead mediator in a peace process involving 29 ethnic communities in Kaduna State that led to the signing of the Kafanchan Peace Declaration. 
She was the chief lead mediator in a peace process involving 56 ethnic communities leading to the Southern Plateau Inter-Communal Peace Declaration in Southern Plateau, Nigeria.

Nderitu served as a member of the Kenya National Committee on the Prevention and Punishment of the Crime of Genocide, War Crimes, Crimes Against Humanity and all Forms of Discrimination and as an Auschwitz Institute Instructor. As an international leader in a male-dominated field, Nderitu has been an advocate of women inclusion in various international forums and has contributed to reports on the issue.

Nderitu also served as a Commissioner of the Presidential Commission of Inquiry into the dissolution of the Makueni County government in Kenya

Quote: "Violence and conflict do not mean the same thing because conflict involves choices that include interventions before it becomes violent. We must now join hands to work towards the kind of interventions that promote community ownership of peace" —Alice Wairimu Nderitu"

Quote: "I saw a comment on a plaque at the genocide memorial in Rwanda that I quote everywhere, to as many people as I can. It said something to the effect that people think of genocides in huge numbers: 1 million in Rwanda, 6 million in the Holocaust, etc. However, in reality, all of those people are not killed in one day. They are killed gradually: two people here, five there, fifteen here, thirty there, and so on and so on. Then, one day, everyone realizes that a million people are dead and we have genocide on our hands. To stop the genocide of a million people, we must stop the deaths of a few that we often take for granted." - Alice Wairimu Nderitu

Recognition
 2011 – Transitional Justice Fellow, Institute for Justice and Reconciliation (IJR)
 2012 – Woman Peace Maker Of the Year, awarded by the Joan B. Kroc Institute for Peace and Justice, University of San Diego, US 
 2014 – Raphael Lemkin - the Auschwitz Institute for Peace and Reconciliation (AIPG)
 2015 – Aspen Leadership scholarship
 2017 – Global Pluralism Award, awarded by Global Centre for Pluralism (His Highness the Aga Khan and the Government of Canada) for commitment to conflict prevention throughout Africa and innovative approach to mediation.
 2018 – Jack P. Blaney Award, awarded by the Morris J. Wosk Centre for Dialogue, Simon Fraser University for using dialogue to support conflict resolution including but not limited to roles in Kenya and Nigeria
 2019 – Diversity and Inclusion Peace and Cohesion Champion Award, Kenya National Diversity Inclusion Award (DIAR awards)
 2022 – Honorary Doctor of Humane Letters Degree, Keene State College.

Publications
 Mukami Kimathi – Mau Mau Woman Freedom Fighter – Wairimu Nderitu
 Anass Bendrif, Sahira al Karaguly, Mohammadi Laghzaoui, Esmah Lahlah, Maeve Moynihan, Alice Nderitũ, Joelle Rizk, and Maytham Al Zubaidi. (2009). An introduction to human rights in the Middle East and North Africa- a guide for NGOs.
 Alice Nderitũ and Jacqueline O’Neill. (2013). 7 myths standing in the way of women’s inclusion. Inclusive Security.
 Alice Wairimũ Nderitũ. (2014). From the Nakuru County peace accord (2010-2012).
 Alice Wairimũ Nderitũ (2016) African Peace Building: Civil Society Roles in Conflict. In Pamela Aall and Chester A. Crocker (Eds). Minding the Gap: African Conflict Management in a Time of Change (2016).
 Alice Wairimũ Nderitũ (2016). Catherine Ndereba: The Authorised Biography of a Marathon World Record holder 
 Alice Wairimũ Nderitũ (2018). Beyond Ethnicism: Exploring Ethnic and Racial Diversity for Educators. Mdahalo Bridging Divides Limited.
 Alice Wairimũ Nderitũ (2018). Kenya: Bridging Ethnic Divides, A Commissioner’s Experience on Cohesion and Integration. Mdahalo Bridging Divides Limited.
 Swanee Hunt & Alice Wairimũ Nderitũ. (2018). WPS as a political movement. In Sara E. Davies & Jacqui True (Eds). The Oxford Handbook of Women, Peace, and Security. New York: Oxford University Press.

References

Kenyan educators
Living people
Year of birth missing (living people)